Canistrum sandrae is a plant species in the genus Canistrum. This species is endemic to Brazil.

References

sandrae
Flora of Brazil